Inversion or inversions may refer to:

Arts
 , a French gay magazine (1924/1925)
 Inversion (artwork), a 2005 temporary sculpture in Houston, Texas
 Inversion (music), a term with various meanings in music theory and musical set theory
 Inversions (novel) by Iain M. Banks
 Inversion (video game), a 2012 third person shooter for Xbox 360, PlayStation 3, and PC
 Inversions (EP), the 2014 extended play album by American rock music ensemble The Colourist
 Inversions (album), a 2019 album by Belinda O'Hooley
 Inversion (film), a 2016 Iranian film

Linguistics and language
 Inversion (linguistics), grammatical constructions where two expressions switch their order of appearance
 Inversion (prosody), the reversal of the order of a foot's elements in poetry
 Anastrophe, a figure of speech also known as an inversion

Mathematics and logic
 Involution (mathematics), a function that is its own inverse (when applied twice, the starting value is obtained)
 Inversion (discrete mathematics), any item that is out of order in a sequence
 Inverse element
 Inversive geometry#Circle inversion, a transformation of the Euclidean plane that maps generalized circles to generalized circles
 Inversion in a point, or point reflection, a kind of isometric (distance-preserving) transformation in a Euclidean space
 Inversion transformation, a conformal transformation (one which preserves angles of intersection)
 Method of inversion, the image of a harmonic function in a sphere (or plane); see Method of image charges
 Multiplicative inverse, the reciprocal of a number (or any other type of element for which a multiplication function is defined)
 Matrix inversion, an operation on a matrix that results in its multiplicative inverse
 Model inversion

 Set inversion

Natural sciences

Biology and medicine
 Inversion (evolutionary biology), a hypothesis about the evolution of the dorsoventral axis in animals
 Inversion (kinesiology), movement of the sole towards the median plane
 Chromosomal inversion, where a segment of a chromosome is reversed end-to-end
 Inversion therapy, the practice of hanging upside down (heart higher than head) for supposed health benefits

Geology
 Inversion (geology), the relative uplift of a previously basinal area resulting from local shortening, in structural geology
 Relief inversion, when a previous depression becomes a landform that stands out from its surroundings
 Seismic inversion, transforming seismic reflection data into a quantitative rock-property description of a geological formation

Physics and chemistry
 Island of inversion, a group of elements with abnormal nuclear shell structure
 Nitrogen inversion, a chemical process in which a trigonal nitrogen-containing structure turns inside-out
 Population inversion, in statistical mechanics, when a system exists in state with more members in an excited state than in lower-energy states
 Pyramidal inversion, a chemical process in which a trigonal structure turns inside-out
 Inverted sugar syrup, a chemical reaction converting sucrose into glucose and fructose

Other uses in the natural sciences
 Inverse problem, the process of calculating from a set of observations the causal factors that produced them
 Inversion (meteorology), air temperature increasing with height

Other uses
 Priority inversion, the condition of a low-priority task holding a shared resource that a high-priority task needs
 Inversion in postcolonial theory, a discursive strategy/gesture in cultural and subaltern studies
 Roller coaster inversion, which turns riders upside-down
 Tax inversion, a form of tax avoidance by moving corporate ownership to low-tax nations

See also 
 Inverse (disambiguation)
 Inverter (disambiguation)
 Sexual inversion (disambiguation)
 Involution (disambiguation)
 Eversion (disambiguation)
 Reversal (disambiguation)